Richmond Municipal Airport  is six miles southeast of Richmond near Boston, in Wayne County, Indiana. It is owned by the Richmond Board of Aviation Commissioners. The National Plan of Integrated Airport Systems for 2011–2015 called it a general aviation facility.

The first airline flights were TWA and Delta DC-3s in late 1947; Lake Central replaced them in 1950-51 and dropped Richmond in 1965.

Facilities
The airport covers 702 acres (284 ha) at an elevation of 1,140 feet (347 m). It has two asphalt runways: 6/24 is 5,500 by 150 feet (1,676 x 46 m) and 15/33 is 5,000 by 100 feet (1,524 x 30 m).

In 2009 the airport had 19,896 aircraft operations, average 54 per day: 97% general aviation, 2% air taxi, and 1% military. 25 aircraft were then based at the airport: 76% single-engine, 16% helicopter, and 8% multi-engine.

Accidents and incidents
On February 11, 2019 a chartered Beech 400 corporate jet overran the runway and crossed a field and a road before coming to rest; the two crew and sole passenger were uninjured. The National Transportation Safety Board determined the aircraft touched down 3,200 feet down the 5,502 foot runway with snow on the runway surface and a tailwind. After the landing the pilots discovered the airport was closed at the time.

References

External links 

 Aerial image from Indiana DOT
 Aerial image as of March 1998 from USGS The National Map
 
 

Airports in Indiana
Transportation buildings and structures in Wayne County, Indiana